Wray or WRAY may refer to:

Places
 19721 Wray, an asteroid
 Wray, Colorado, United States
 Wray, Georgia, United States
 Wray, Lancashire, a village of Lancashire, England, United Kingdom
 Wray 17-96, a star in the Scorpius constellation
 Wray-with-Botton, Lancashire, England, United Kingdom

Businesses
 J. Wray and Nephew Ltd., a subsidiary of the Campari Group, Jamaica
 Wray (lenses), a former British camera and lens manufacturer
 WRAY (AM), an AM radio station licensed to Princeton, Indiana, United States
 WRAY-FM, an FM radio station licensed to Princeton, Indiana, United States
 WRAY-TV, a television station licensed to Wilson, North Carolina, United States
 WRAY-TV (Indiana), a former television station licensed to Princeton, Indiana, United States

People
 Wray (surname)
 Wray baronets, two baronetcies in the Baronetage of England, United Kingdom
 Diane Wray Williams, American politician, businesswoman, and teacher

Other
 Wray baronets, two extinct titles in the Baronetage of England, United Kingdom
 Wray Castle, Cumbria, England, United Kingdom
 Wray (month), the first month of the Afghan calendar
 The Wrays, an American country music group

See also
 Wrey (disambiguation)
 Ray (disambiguation)